The horned guan (Oreophasis derbianus) is a large, turkey-like bird native to Central America. It is the only species in the genus Oreophasis.

Taxonomy
The holotype specimen of "Oreophasis Derbianus " G.R. Gray (Gen. Bds., 3, 1844, p.(485).) is held in the collections of National Museums Liverpool at World Museum, with accession number NML-VZ D210. The specimen was collected from Volcán de Fuego, Guatemala by Don Joaquin Quinones circa 1843 and came to the Liverpool national collection via the 13th Earl of Derby’s collection which was bequeathed to the people of Liverpool.

Phylogeny
The horned guan is not a true guan, but merely resembles these birds most in overall shape and color, whereas the horn is more reminiscent of the helmeted curassows. In fact, this species is the only survivor of a very ancient lineage of cracids that has been evolving independently from all other living members of this family for at least 20 million years, and possibly as much as 40 million years.

Although it does not have any really close relatives among living cracids, the true guans are apparently most distant. Given that the basal relationships of the living cracids are not well resolved, the horned guan is often placed into a distinct subfamily, the Oreophasinae. Alternatively, it might be included in a large Cracinae with curassows and chachalacas.

Description
The breast and upper belly are white, and its long tail feathers are black with a white band near the base. Both sexes are similar. The young are duller with a smaller horn, and have a brown tail and wings.

Distribution and habitat
The horned guan is distributed in humid mountain forests of southeastern Mexico (Chiapas) and Guatemala in Central America.

Diet
Its diet consists mainly of fruits, green leaves, and invertebrates.

Breeding
The female usually lays one or two eggs.

Conservation
Due to ongoing habitat loss, small population size, limited range, and hunting in some areas, the horned guan is evaluated as Endangered on the IUCN Red List of Threatened Species. It is listed on Appendix I of CITES.

References
Pereira, Sérgio Luiz; Baker, Allan J.& Wajntal, Anita (2002): Combined nuclear and mitochondrial DNA sequences resolve generic relationships within the Cracidae (Galliformes, Aves). Systematic Biology 51(6): 946–958.   PDF fulltext

External links
BirdLife Species Factsheet 
Horned Guan photo, Article Aventuras Naturales
Horned Guan image; Article (Oil paintings)
Stamps (for Mexico, three types)
Horned Guan photo gallery VIREO
Horned Guan videos on the Internet Bird Collection

horned guan
Birds of Guatemala
Birds of Mexico
horned guan
horned guan
Central American montane forests